Miaotou station is a future metro station of Guangzhou Metro Line 5 in Guangzhou, China. It will be located at the underground of Guangshen Highway, the west of Geqiang Lu, in Huangpu District.

References

Railway stations in Guangdong
Huangpu District, Guangzhou
Proposed Guangzhou Metro stations

zh:庙头站 (广州)